Operation Snowball was a conventional explosive test to obtain information on nuclear weapon detonations run by the Defence Research Board with participation from the United Kingdom and United States. The test was held at the Suffield Experimental Station in Alberta and was the largest ever man-made, non-accidental explosion in Canada. The test was also the first of its kind using a stacked TNT block hemisphere of such magnitude, a method repeated in six subsequent tests such as Operation Sailor Hat and Prairie Flat. The test allowed verifying predicted properties of shock and blast and determining its effect on a variety of military targets at varied distances from ground zero.

Background
Suffield Experimental Station is situated in an isolated part of the rolling prairie terrain of Alberta and at the time of the test was part of a 1000 square mile test range. This unique landscape offers clear views due to lack of trees and favorable weather conditions. Starting in the fall of 1963, teams from the involved countries began assembling at the test grounds for the joint operation, one of many in a series of non-nuclear blast tests under the Tripartite Technical Cooperation Program. Initial preparations and construction work began in the winter of 1963 which was unusually mild and proved helpful. Virtually the entire station was mobilized for the effort and unusual equipment was designed and manufactured at the site's engineering and machine shops.

The casting of the TNT was performed on site and began two years in advance of the test. Molten TNT was poured into special 12x12x4 inch rectangular molds and allowed to cool for 5 hours producing smooth caramel-colored rectangular blocks. A total of 30,678 were made with an average weight of 32.6 pounds each.

Test
Construction of the TNT hemisphere began six days before detonation. To protect from dust and sunlight and due to risk of lightning, the construction was not done in the open; instead, a building was constructed at ground zero that was to be wheeled away when the charge was complete. Each block was carefully fitted into a pre-calculated position to approximate a perfect hemisphere. When completed the stack measured 34 feet in diameter.

Columns were drilled 80 feet into the ground at the blast site and then back filled with a colored soil mix to measure the expected horizontal and vertical displacement. Various military targets were also placed around the blast site. Local residents in Medicine Hat may have seen unusual cargo arriving on rail flatcars including heavy Jupiter and Nike configuration rockets. Other targets included a minefield, chambers and tunnels, reinforced concrete arches, fiberglass shelters, full scale troop models exposed and inside vehicles and gas masks. 60% of the targets were buried. Smoke mortars were installed to provide a white trail by which the shock wave could be tracked high above ground. An RCAF Neptune aircraft was also immediately above the test area for aerial photography.

The detonation turned the TNT into a mass of highly pressurized gas and produced a large fireball and mushroom shaped cloud. The resulting crater was 240 feet across and within minutes partially filled with water. Unexpectedly, the crater also had a central updraft similar to moon craters which resulted in much speculation by the scientists. Many target objects were moved and damaged by the overpressure blast, especially the heavy rockets, and two M113 armored personnel carriers were flipped on their side. After the test, a full cross section of the crater was excavated to analyze the effects below ground.

References 

Explosions in Canada
Explosions in 1964
1964 in Canada
Military projects of the United States
1964 in military history
Snowball